Lallu Ki Laila is a Bhojpuri language comedy romance drama film directed by Sushil Kumar Upadhyay and produced by Ratnakar Kumar with co-produced by Sushil Singh and Prakash Jais under banner of "Worldwide Channel". It stars Dinesh Lal Yadav "Nirahua", Amrapali Dubey and Yamini Singh in the lead roles, while  Kanak Pandey, Sanjay Pandey, Sushil Singh, Prakash Jais, Dev Singh, Deepak Sinha, Reena Rani and Imroj Akhtar "Munna" in supporting roles.

Cast
Dinesh Lal Yadav "Nirahua" as Lallu aka Lallan Sinha
Amrapali Dubey as Divya
Yamini Singh as Kajal
Kanak Pandey as Priya Chaudhary
Sanjay Pandey as Dilawar
Sushil Singh as Raghunandan, Divya's father
 Prakash Jais as Sansani, Lallu's friend
 Dev Singh as Rocky
 Deepak Sinha as Kailashnath Sinha, Lallu's father
 Reena Rani as Durga, Lallu's mother
 Jai Prakash Singh
 J Neelam as Padma Rai
 Imroj Akhtar "Munna"

Production
The film is directed by Sushil Kumar Upadhyay and Ratnakar Kumar with co-produced by Prakash Jais and Sushil Kumar and written by Sanjay Rai. The cinematography has been done by R R Prince while choreography is by Kanu Mukerjee, Ram Devan and Dilip Mistri. Gurjent Singh is the editor and action done by Dilip Yadav. It will be released in September 2019.

Music
Music of "Lallu Ki Laila" is composed by Madhukar Anand with lyrics penned by Azad Singh, Santosh Puri and Sandeep Sajan. It is produced under the "Worldwide Records Bhojpuri" label, owned by film producer Ratnakar Kumar.

Track list

Marketing
First-look poster was this film released on 1 June 2019 on official Instagram handle of Amrapali Dubey. second-look poster is out on 17 July 2019 at official Instagram handle of actress Yamini Singh. The film is scheduled to released on 9 August 2019 at all theatres.

Trailer of this film is released on 3 August 2019 at official YouTube channel of "Worldwide Records Bhojpuri", who also bought his satellite rights.

Due to some issue film was postponed to release in August, he is rescheduled to release on 13 September 2019 in all theatres.

Film is released on 12 September 2019 in Mumbai and 13 September 2019 in Bihar and Jharkhand.

References

2019 films
2010s Bhojpuri-language films